Lääne Elu is an Estonian language newspaper based in the city of Haapsalu, Estonia. The paper was started in 1989.

References

External links

1989 establishments in Estonia
Estonian-language newspapers
Lääne County
Mass media in Haapsalu
Newspapers published in Estonia
Newspapers established in 1989